Manuela de Jesús Arias Espinosa (7 July 1904 – 22 July 1981), also known by her religious name María Inés Teresa of the Blessed Sacrament, was a Mexican Roman Catholic professed religious and the founder of both the Poor Clare Missionary Sisters of the Blessed Sacrament (1945) and the Missionaries of Christ for the Universal Church (1979). She lived during the time of the Cristero War and remained out of the nation during some of it in order to avoid the anti-religious persecution of the times.

Espinosa's beatification was celebrated in Mexico on 21 April 2012 with Cardinal Angelo Amato presiding over the celebration on the behalf of Pope Benedict XVI.

Life

Manuela de Jesús Arias Espinosa was born in Mexico in 1904 as the fifth of eight children to the pious Eustaquio Arias Arroniz and María Espinosa López Portillo. She made her First Communion in 1911.

Her religious calling blossomed in 1924 after attending a religious congress from 5–12 October 1924 and received inspiration after reading an account of Saint Thérèse of Lisieux. But her firm decision to enter the religious life did not come until the Feast of Christ the King in 1926.

Espinosa entered the "Ave Maria" convent in Los Angeles on 5 June 1929. Espinosa made her initial vows on 12 December 1930. She made her perpetual vows on 14 December 1933 and lived the cloistered life in the religious name of "María Inés Teresa of the Blessed Sacrament"; her time in the cloistered life lasted until 1949. Espinosa founded – on 23 August 1945 – the Poor Clare Missionary Sisters of the Blessed Sacrament in Cuernavaca in Morelos and received the papal decree of praise in 1949 and the full approval of Pope Pius XII on 22 June 1951. She received the affectionate name of "Manuelita".

Her next and final order founded was titled the Missionaries of Christ for the Universal Church and was established on 23 November 1979 in Nievo León. On 9 December 1980 she had an audience with Pope John Paul II in Rome.

Espinosa died in Rome in 1981. Over six thousand of her spiritual writings still remain. Her first order now operates in places such as Ireland and Indonesia while the second operates in Sierra Leone.

Beatification

The beatification process first had to receive the decree that transferred the competent forum from the Diocese of Rome on 20 March 1992 that led to her being titled as a Servant of God on 1 December 1992 under Pope John Paul II once the Congregation for the Causes of Saints granted the official "nihil obstat" ('nothing against') to the cause. The diocesan process that opened in Cuernavaca spanned from 31 October 1992 until 15 October 1996 while Cardinal Camillo Ruini inaugurated another process in Rome that spanned from 25 March 1994 until 26 June 1996. Roman officials validated the diocesan process on 25 October 1997.

The official dossier – known as the Positio – came into the possession of Roman officials in 1999 while a group of theologians voted in favor just under a decade later on 26 September 2008 while the cardinal and bishop members of the C.C.S. voted also to approve the contents of the dossier in a meeting of 17 February 2009. Espinosa was proclaimed to be Venerable on 3 April 2009 after Pope Benedict XVI confirmed that the late religious had lived a model Christian life of heroic virtue.

The process for the investigation of an alleged miracle opened in Guadalajara on 26 October 2002 and concluded on 4 November 2002 while later receiving C.C.S. validation on 28 November 2003. The miracle in question involved the 2001 healing of the child Franciscan Javier Carrillo Guzmán who had drowned in his pool. The medical board voted in favor of the miracle on 27 May 2010 while a board of theologians followed suit on 15 January 2011; the C.C.S. voted in favor of the miracle as well on 21 June 2011 and passed it onto Benedict XVI on 27 June 2011 for his approval.

Espinosa's beatification was celebrated on 21 April 2012 in Mexico. The delegate that presided at the beatification was Cardinal Angelo Amato while Guzmán – whose miracle led to the beatification – presented the relics at the celebration. The apostolic nuncio to Mexico Christophe Pierre and Cardinal Norberto Rivera Carrera were also in attendance.

The current postulator that is assigned to the cause is Sr. Silvia Burnes Sánchez.

References

External links
Hagiography Circle
Saints SQPN

1904 births
1981 deaths
20th-century venerated Christians
20th-century Mexican people
Beatifications by Pope Benedict XVI
Founders of Catholic religious communities
Mexican beatified people
People from Nayarit
Venerated Catholics